Nicolas M. Salgo (August 17, 1914 – February 26, 2005) was an American diplomat. A non-career appointee, he served as the U.S. Ambassador Extraordinary and Plenipotentiary to Hungary from 1983 until 1986.  His nomination, in 1992, to be Ambassador to Sweden, was not acted upon by the Senate.

Biography
Salgo was born in Budapest, Hungary on August 17, 1914. He received his LLD and PhD in 1937 from Eötvös Loránd University in Budapest.  Salgo became a US citizen in 1953.  Among various professional endeavors, he was founder and limited ownership partner of the Watergate complex.  He was a consultant for Central and Eastern Europe to the United States Information Agency from 1982 to 1983.  He was named to Ronald Reagan’s International Private Enterprise Task Force.  When he returned to the US after serving as ambassador, he continued working with the State Department on "bilateral property projects involving Eastern European nations".  By 1989, President George H. W. Bush appointed him Special Negotiator for Property Issues, with the permanent rank of Ambassador.  While in Hungary, he became an avid art collector.

References

External links
The Association for Diplomatic Studies and Training Foreign Affairs Oral History Project AMBASSADOR NICHOLAS M. SALGO

1914 births
2005 deaths
Diplomats from Budapest
Ambassadors of the United States to Hungary
Hungarian emigrants to the United States
Eötvös Loránd University alumni
George H. W. Bush administration personnel
Reagan administration personnel
American art collectors
American real estate businesspeople